Blenina chlorophila is a moth of the family Nolidae first described by George Hampson in 1905. It is found in India, Sri Lanka, Taiwan, Peninsular Malaysia and Borneo.

Description
Its forewings have green and grayish variegations. The hindwings are dark blackish brown. There is a sinuous dark yellowish medial band in the hindwings. Its larval food plants are from the genus Shorea.

Gallery

References

Moths of Asia
Moths described in 1905
Nolidae